"Swing Your Own Thing" is the second single released from PMD's debut album, Shade Business. It was not as successful as his previous single, only making it to 40 on the Billboard's Hot Rap Singles.

Single track listing
"Swing Your Own Thing" (Izum Remix)- 3:20
"Swing Your Own Thing" (Album Version)- 3:38
"Shadé Business" (The Beatnuts Remix) 3:55
"Shadé Business" (Ghetto Style Remix)- 3:45

1994 singles
PMD (rapper) songs
1994 songs
RCA Records singles
Songs written by PMD (rapper)